John Russell was a Scottish footballer who played in the 1920s. Following an unsuccessful spell with Airdrie he signed for Dumbarton in the summer of 1924 and went on to be a regular in the team for the next four seasons.

References

Scottish footballers
Dumbarton F.C. players
Airdrieonians F.C. (1878) players
Scottish Football League players
Year of birth missing
Association football midfielders